Harpalus anxius is a species of phytophagous and xerophilous
ground beetle that is native to Palearctic realm.

Description

Distribution
Its range includes Europe and the Near East. In Europe it is only absent in the following countries or islands: Andorra, the Azores, the Canary Islands, the Channel Islands, Crete, Cyclades, Cyprus, Dodecanese, the Faroe Islands, Franz Josef Land, Gibraltar, Iceland, Madeira, Malta, Monaco, the North Aegean islands, Norway, Novaya Zemlya, Portugal, San Marino, the Savage Islands, Sicily, Svalbard and Jan Mayen, and Vatican City. Its presence on the Balearic Islands and Sardinia is doubtful. In Ireland it can be found in Meath and Kerry counties.

Habitat
Harpalus anxius prefers sandy heath and dunes.

References

External links

anxius
Beetles of Europe
Beetles described in 1812